The armorial of Canadian universities is the collection of coats of arms of universities in Canada. Approximately 60 Canadian universities have their own coats of arms. Coats of arms are designed to represent the history and values of the institutions they represent and are used as a brand image for the university. Canadian coats of arms often incorporate First Nations symbolism. 

Coats of arms include a number of elements or parts (e.g., Escutcheon, Crest, Supporters, Badge). Some also include a motto, although this may be used separately from the coat of arms. Detailed information about the coats of arms of Canadian universities is listed on the Public Register of Arms, Flags and Badges.

Alberta

British Columbia

Manitoba

New Brunswick

Newfoundland and Labrador

Nova Scotia

Ontario

Prince Edward Island

Quebec

Saskatchewan

References

Universities and colleges in Canada